Mediations is the journal of the Marxist Literary Group. It was established by Fredric Jameson as a theoretical newsletter in the early 1970s and transformed into a peer-reviewed  academic journal in 1990-1991 by Ron Strickland and Chris Newfield. The journal was reorganized in 2007 as a web-based journal, appearing twice yearly and publishing dossiers of translated material on special topics and open-submission issues, usually in alternation.

References

External links 
 

Political science journals
Marxist journals
Publications with year of establishment missing
Biannual journals
English-language journals
University of Illinois Chicago
Socialism in the United States